AJ, or variants, may refer to:

Arts, entertainment and media

Fictional characters
 A. J. (The Fairly OddParents), a fictional character
 A.J. Soprano, a fictional character in The Sopranos
 Superspinner AJ, a fictional character in the Starflyers series of computer games
 AJ, in AJ and the Queen, an American comedy-drama TV series
 Apollo Justice, a fictional character from Apollo Justice: Ace Attorney

Literature
 Architects' Journal, an architectural magazine
 The Astronomical Journal, a peer-reviewed monthly scientific journal

Media
 Aj (newspaper), a Hindi-language daily broadsheet newspaper in India

Businesses and organisations
 Al Jazeera, a Qatar-based international Arabic news channel
 AJ+, an online news and current events channel
 AJ Capital Partners, an American private real estate company 
 AJ's Fine Foods, an American supermarket chain 
 AJ Institute of Engineering and Technology, in Mangalore, India

Other uses
 AJ (given name), including a list of people with the name or nickname
 aJ, attojoule, a unit of energy equal to 10−18 joules
 Australian Scout Jamboree, a triennial festival 
 North American AJ Savage, an aircraft

See also

 
 
 A&J (disambiguation)
 Ajay (disambiguation)
 "Aj, aj, aj", a 1973 song by Schytts